The Conquest of Canaan is a 1916 American silent drama film directed by George Irving and starring Edith Taliaferro, Jack Sherrill and Ralph Delmore. It was based on the novel by Booth Tarkington which was subsequently remade as a 1921 film of the same title.

Cast
 Edith Taliaferro as Ariel Tabor
 Jack Sherrill as Joe Louden
 Ralph Delmore as Judge Pike
 Marie Wells as Mamie Pike 
 Jean La Motte as Claudine
 Jack Hopkins as Happy Fear
 Walter Hiers as Norman Flitcroft
 Thomas Ward as Nashville Corey
 Ben Hendricks Sr. as Mike 
 Philip Robson as Martin Mann 
 David Higgins as Frank R. Buck

References

Bibliography
 Robert B. Connelly. The Silents: Silent Feature Films, 1910-36, Volume 40, Issue 2. December Press, 1998.

External links
 

1916 films
1916 drama films
1910s English-language films
American silent feature films
Silent American drama films
American black-and-white films
Films directed by George Irving
1910s American films